Igor Vyacheslavovich Egorov (born 4 November 1968) is a Russian football official and a former referee and player. He works as a team director with FC Yenisey Krasnoyarsk.

Refereeing career
He has been a FIFA international referee since 2003. He lives in Nizhny Novgorod and is a businessman. He was named best Russian referee by the Sport Express newspaper in 2006 and 2007. He has refereed games in the UEFA Champions League and UEFA Cup, as well as UEFA Euro 2008 and 2010 FIFA World Cup qualifiers.

Personal life
He is the father of former Dzerzhinsk defender Yegor Yegorov, who became a referee himself in 2014.

References

1968 births
Sportspeople from Nizhny Novgorod
Living people
Russian football referees
Association football midfielders
Soviet footballers
FC Lokomotiv Nizhny Novgorod players
FC Khimik Dzerzhinsk players